The 1959 Polish Speedway season was the 1959 season of motorcycle speedway in Poland.

Individual

Polish Individual Speedway Championship
The 1959 Individual Speedway Polish Championship was held on 30 August at Rybnik.

Team

Team Speedway Polish Championship
The 1959 Team Speedway Polish Championship was the 12th edition of the Team Polish Championship.

First League 

Medalists

Second League

Third League

References

Poland Individual
Poland Team
Speedway